The Pono River ( or ) is a river on the Indonesian part of the island of Timor, which is in the territory of the East Nusa Tenggara province, about 2000 km east of the Indonesian capital, Jakarta.

History
On November 4, 2010, the river overflowed, killing some 16 people, destroying 134 homes, and displacing 825 people from their homes.

Geography 

The river flows in the southwest of Timor with predominantly tropical savanna climate (designated as Aw in the Köppen–Geiger climate classification system). The annual average temperature in the area is 25 °C. The warmest month is October, when the average temperature is around 28 °C, and the coldest is February, at 22 °C. The average annual rainfall is 1575 mm. The wettest month is January, with an average of 297 mm, and the driest is September, with 6 mm rainfall.

See also
List of rivers of Indonesia
List of rivers of Lesser Sunda Islands
List of rivers of West Timor

References

Rivers of West Timor
Rivers of Timor
Rivers of Indonesia